Wyre may refer to:

Places 
 Wyre, Orkney, an island in Scotland
 Borough of Wyre, a local government district in Lancashire, England
 Wyre (UK Parliament constituency)
 River Wyre, a river in Lancashire, England
 Wyre Forest, a woodland in Shropshire and Worcestershire, England
 Wyre Piddle, a village in Worcestershire
 Afon Wyre (Welsh for River Wyre), a river in Ceredigion, Wales

Radio stations 
 WYRE (AM), a radio station in Annapolis, Maryland, United States
 WYRE-FM or WBHU, a radio station licensed to serve St. Augustine Beach, Florida, United States
 WWNL, formerly WYRE, a radio station in Pittsburgh, Pennsylvania, United States
 The Wyre, a former radio station serving north Worcestershire, England

People
 Wyre (musician), Kenyan musician 
 John Wyre, Canadian percussionist
 Wyre Davies, Welsh journalist

Other uses 
 Wyre (comics), a fictional character featured in the publications of Marvel Comics

See also 
 Wire (disambiguation)